Teo Edo Farré (born 2 December 1979 in Barcelona, Catalonia) is a long-distance freestyle swimmer from Spain, who competed for his native country at the 2000 Summer Olympics in Sydney, Australia. There he finished in 24th in the 1500m Freestyle. In the same event he won the bronze medal a year earlier, at the European SC Championships 1999 in Lisbon, Portugal.

References
 Spanish Olympic Committee

1979 births
Living people
Spanish male freestyle swimmers
Olympic swimmers of Spain
Swimmers at the 2000 Summer Olympics
Swimmers from Barcelona